Seth Abid Hussain (1933 – 8 January 2021) was a legendary Pakistani millionaire and gold merchant philanthropist.

It is said that when the US government banned Pakistan from importing nuclear reprocessing plants, it was Hussain who delivered the nuclear reprocessing plant to Pakistan from France by sea. His net worth in 2017 was estimated to be around US$3 billion. He was nicknamed "The King of Gold" in Pakistan.

Welfare work
Hussain was founder of Hamza Foundation Academy for the Deaf in Lahore and initial donor of Shaukat Khanum Memorial Cancer Hospital and Research Centre as per Imran Khan.

References

1936 births
2021 deaths
Pakistani businesspeople
Pakistani philanthropists